Oakbrook Center is a shopping center located near Interstate 88 and Route 83 in Oak Brook, Illinois. It was originally opened in 1962. It is the second largest shopping center in the Chicago metropolitan area by gross leasable area, only surpassed by Woodfield Mall in Schaumburg, Illinois. It is one of the top shopping centers in the country - both in terms of sales per square foot and total asset value. Current anchor stores include Neiman Marcus, Nordstrom, and Macy's  

Smaller luxury shops include Gucci, Tiffany & Co, Louis Vuitton, Chanel, Aesop, Oliver Peoples,  Shinola, Tory Burch, Burberry, Ralph Lauren, Golden Goose, Yves Saint Laurent, and Reformation.

History
Oakbrook Center, which was originally to be named Oakbrook Terrace (but the name was changed when a town near the mall took that name), opened in 1962 with Sears and Marshall Field's, as well as a Jewel Food Store. Bonwit Teller was later added, as was Lord & Taylor in 1973 on the south side.  I. Magnin, Saks Fifth Avenue, and Neiman Marcus joined the center in a 1981–1982 expansion that doubled the physical size of the center with a new southeast court.

On Christmas Day 1964, a single-screen movie theater operated by Balaban & Katz Corporation (later taken over by Plitt Theatres) was opened at the Oakbrook Center near Saks Fifth Avenue. On its twenty-third year of operation in 1987, the single screen theater was split into four screens when Cineplex Odeon Corporation took it over. Cineplex Odeon also added another four screens, topped by additional retail (including a bookstore), near the Saks Fifth Avenue anchor; these screens closed in 2001 and then reopened in 2018. Bonwit Teller closed their location in 1990, while I. Magnin was shuttered in January 1991, with its former site subdivided in 1994 for specialty stores, including Eddie Bauer and Tiffany & Company.  In 1991, a new two-story, open-air addition opened northeast of Sears. Built on top of a parking garage, it added  of mall retail and a  Nordstrom. Maggiano's Little Italy opened that same year. Corner Bakery Cafe opened to customers on December 3, 1992. In 1998, Wildfire Restaurant opened.

Saks Fifth Avenue closed its store in 2002 and sold the location to Federated Department Stores, which used the site to open a 90,000-square-foot, three-story Bloomingdale's Home store on September 12, 2003. Cheesecake Factory opened in August 2004. Marshall Field's adopted the Macy's name on September 8, 2006 with Macy's buying the parent company. On November 12, 2008, Barnes & Noble opened. A year later, in 2009, American Apparel (which closed in 2017) opened. In 2010, Gibson's Bar and Steakhouse opened across the street from the mall. Pandora opened its doors in 2011.

General Growth Properties acquired a half-interest and management of the mall in 2004, when it acquired The Rouse Company (which had itself acquired its stake the mall in 2002). It is currently co-owned by Brookfield Properties and CalPERS.

Pinstripes opened as a stand-alone location in the mall parking lot in 2012. In November 2013, Perry's Steakhouse opened in the former basement level of Neiman Marcus.

On January 4, 2012, Bloomingdale's announced that it would close its Oakbrook Home store by March of the year. Two years later in 2014, that building was split and fully leased out to six smaller tenants: The Container Store on the first level; Lululemon Athletica, Tommy Bahama, Hugo Boss, and Aritzia on the second level; and the first PIRCH store outside of California on the third level. PIRCH closed its store on September 30, 2017 as it returned to its original California roots.

In August 2014, Le Méridien opened a 172 guest-room hotel in a former Renaissance Hotel, which was originally a Stouffer Hotel.  This is their first in the state of Illinois.

On October 13, 2016, AMC Theatres opened a new 12-screen cinema in a remodeled section of the Nordstrom wing; this remodeling also included a new food hall named "The District."

On June 20, 2017, Sears announced that its Oakbrook Center space would be reconstructed to feature additional stores. It shuttered in September 2017 and reopened on October 5, 2018, on the first level of the mall. KidZania will be joining the center by 2020. Ballard Designs and L.L. Bean, opened on November 9, 2018, and the former of which opened during fall 2018. Additionally, the Sears Auto Center will be replaced by a fitness center that will open sometime in 2020.

On February 26, 2018, it was announced that the Lord & Taylor location at the mall would be closing.

On April 22, 2019, only seven months after reopening, it was announced that Sears would also shutter on April 28, 2019. Puttshack joined on November 3, 2021.

In September 2021, a three-story Restoration Hardware store opened. It features a restaurant and winery at the top.

On December 23, 2021, a shooting was reported at the mall around 5:44pm CST. The incident was apparently a shootout between two individuals. One of the shooters was struck four times, was treated and is in custody; the other escaped capture. Three bystanders were struck in the incident. All persons involved had non-life-threatening injuries. The mall re-opened the following day.

Bus routes
Pace

 301 Roosevelt Road 
 322 Cermak Road/22nd Street 
 332 River Road/York Road

References

External links
 Website
 Encyclopedia of Chicago entry

1962 establishments in Illinois
Oak Brook, Illinois
Shopping malls established in 1962
Brookfield Properties
Shopping malls in DuPage County, Illinois